Gareth Thomas Rhys Emery (born 18 July 1980) is a British trance producer and DJ. He is best known for his three studio albums: Northern Lights, Drive and 100 Reasons to Live, and winning the prestigious A State of Trance Tune of the Year award three times.

Background
Gareth Emery was born in Southampton, England, United Kingdom  His sister is the singer-songwriter Roxanne Emery. He lived in Southampton until the age of 26 before relocating to Manchester where he had a studio and ran a night club and record label, both called Garuda. He has a degree in Politics from University of Warwick and is trained in classical piano. Prior to becoming involved in electronic music he played guitar in a punk band in the mid-nineties. He now lives in Los Angeles with his wife Kat and two daughters.

Emery's production style is influenced by various genres of electronic dance music.

Breakthrough
Emery's debut vinyl release was a white label remix of The Shrink's "Nervous Breakdown" which was released in early 2002. However, the track that launched his career is generally considered to be his third release: GTR – "Mistral". It was created entirely on a computer over the course of a two-week holiday in Provence. Paul van Dyk debuted the track live on the radio during the Nature One Festival in 2002 and it subsequently received support from some of the world's leading DJs, including Tiësto, Armin van Buuren and Ferry Corsten.

Emery was ranked at #34 in DJ Mag's Top 100 poll in 2006, #31 in 2007, #23 in 2008, #9 in 2009 and #7 in 2010. In 2011, Emery dropped to #13. He was ranked at #14 in 2012, and dropped further to #51 in 2013. in 2014 he dropped to #74, and in 2015 he is out of the DJ Mag Poll.

Albums and remixes
Emery has released five compilation mix CDs during his career: The Five AM Sessions (2005), The Podcast Annual (2007), The Sound Of Garuda (2009) and The Sound Of Garuda: Chapter 2 (2011) and Electric For Life in 2015. His debut artist album Northern Lights was released in 2010, and achieved considerable success, climbing to no.1 in the US iTunes dance chart. The album also contained one of his most successful tracks "Sanctuary", which was voted the 2nd biggest track of 2010 by listeners of Armin van Buuren's A State Of Trance radio show, and then became the most played record of 2011 on US' Sirius XM Radio dance station, BPM. In 2011, a remixed edition of the album was released entitled Northern Lights Re-Lit with remixes by acts including Hardwell, Arty, Giuseppe Ottaviani, John O’Callaghan, Lange and Ashley Wallbridge. On 1 April 2014, Gareth Emery released his second studio album Drive, which was followed by Drive Refueled remix album a year later.

In 2006, Gareth Emery remixed "Flow" by Vinny Troia and Jaidene Veda on Curvve Recordings, which climbed to #24 on Billboard magazine's "Hot Dance Club Play" charts.

On 1 April 2016, Gareth Emery released his third studio album 100 Reasons to Live, featuring collaborations with Alex & Sierra, Janet Devlin, Lawson and Christina Novelli.

In 2016 Emery has also released a single "CVNT5" together with Ashley Wallbridge. The "CVNT5" music video is a satirical view on careers of popular electronic dance music acts.

On 30 January 2017, Emery released a single titled "Saving Light" with artist Standerwick and Haliene on the Canadian label Monstercat. The song and its music video were a collaboration with the charity Ditch The Label in an effort to prevent bullying among children and young adults. The music video for Saving Light has received over 2 million views on YouTube as of December 2017. On 21 December, Armin van Buuren announced that Saving Light won the A State of Trance "Tune of the Year" for 2017.

DJ Mag controversy 
Between 2006 and 2013 Gareth Emery ranked in DJ Mag's Top 50 DJs in the world, peaking at No. 7 in 2010. However, in 2013, he publicly denounced the poll due to the huge marketing budgets involved, asking fans no longer to vote for him, and donated his marketing budget to charity instead:"So here's an alternative Top 100 message: Don't vote for me. Seriously, when you buy a ticket to see me in a club, I consider that a vote. When you blast my music in your car, or share it on Facebook, or tell your friends about it, that's a vote too. Those votes, and the amazing support you've shown over the last year, is what matters to me."This move was covered by many dance music blogs.

Labels
From 2003 to 2008, Gareth co-owned now defunct label Five AM under which some of his biggest hits from the time were released (Mistral / This Is That / More Than Anything). In late 2008 he left Five AM and started a new label called Garuda. The first Garuda release was his own record Exposure / Metropolis released in May 2009.

Since then all Emery's records have been released through Garuda. It is named after the bird-like creature from Hindu and Buddhist mythology, which Emery became aware of whilst touring Indonesia. The label has released records by artists including Ben Gold, Tritonal, M.I.K.E. and Blake Jarrell. The label also runs occasional club nights.  Guests have included Ferry Corsten, Markus Schulz, Above & Beyond (band) and Sander Van Doorn.

Podcast and SiriusXM show
Since March 2006, Emery has produced the "Gareth Emery Podcast". It has been nominated for "Best Podcast" at the Miami Winter Music Conference's International Dance Music Awards three times. In July 2012, Emery launched a syndicated radio show in North America called "Gareth Emery Presents" on the SiriusXM channel Electric Area (Channel 52). The show is broadcast at 5pm ET Fridays with a repeat at 8pm ET Tuesdays.

In November 2014, Emery announced that Episode 310 would be the final episode of the "Gareth Emery Podcast". He explained on social media:

"After doing the show more or less every week since 2006 I guess I'd become a bit too comfortable, and I sometimes felt like I was producing the show on auto pilot for the last year or so. Saying the same old **** and playing the same sounding music, and probably playing it a bit too safe, choosing the obvious bangers and hot promos rather than pushing myself to dig out those hidden gems like I always used to."

Emery then followed up with an announcement of a new podcast from his new SiriusXM show called "ELECTRIC FOR LIFE" In May 2015, Gareth Emery partnered with Electronic Music lifestyle brand Electric Family to produce a collaboration bracelet for which the proceeds are donated to his charitable foundation, Electric For Life.

Satire
On 11 March 2016, Emery released single "CVNT5" together with Ashley Wallbridge. The "CVNT5" music video is a satirical view on careers of popular electronic dance music acts. The video featured two aspiring DJs played by Emery and Wallbridge who hoped to appear on the Forbes Highest-Paid DJs list. They climbed to international stardom by hiring a ghost-producer to create their songs and buying many Twitter followers, while dressing in ludicrous clothing and wigs. The song later appeared on Emery's third studio album 100 Reasons to Live. They released a second single on 19 March 2016 titled "They Don't Want Us To Win", which featured a sample from DJ Khaled saying "win" in the song's buildup. Wallbridge revealed that the project came to light during a drunken conversation in a pub, which purpose was to "have a laugh" and satirise the clichés in dance culture.

The duo released a follow-up video through YouTube titled "DJ Mag Corruption Exposed: A CVNT5 Documentary" on 14 October 2016. The mockumentary showed CVNT5 continuing their attempt to reach number one on DJ Mag's annual Top 100 DJs list, notably by investing $50,000 into advertising, paying a black market Vietnamese click farm to generate votes, and bribing key figures in DJ Mag. CVNT5 ended up winning number two on the rankings despite their efforts, likely due to another individual paying the magazine's Editor In Chief with a diamond-encrusted watch. Critics felt that the video served as criticism to DJ Mag's list; referring to the time in 2015 where DJs Dimitri Vegas & Like Mike won first place under suspicious circumstances, specifically by vote buying and having staff members walk around with iPads at their performing venues to secure extra votes.

On 18 June 2018, American video streaming service go90 announced eight episodes of "We Are CVNT5", which will expand on the original CVNT5 mockumentary. The series was directed by Matt Enlow, written by Emery, Alex Madden and Geraint Jones, and featured Paul Holowaty, Taylor Misiak, Dillon Francis, and Pete Tong. The series was based heavily on Emery's musical experience during the United States' electronic dance music boom. A trailer for the series was released on 25 June 2018. Emery revealed through Facebook that the project encountered many issues during its production, including "tears", "screaming", and lawsuits, but managed to complete it in time. All eight episodes of "We Are CVNT5" were made available on 28 June 2018.

Electric For Life 
Electric For Life is Gareth's new brand which replaced the eight year old Gareth Emery Podcast in November 2014. It is a radio show, live show, and charitable foundation.

All proceeds from the Electric For a Life Foundation shows are donated to help vulnerable groups in society. The first show was a fundraiser for the Greater Vancouver Food Bank which raised $15,000.

On 28 November 2015, Gareth hosted Electric For Life Day, a 24-hour live broadcast involving Armin van Buuren, Paul van Dyk, W&W, Above & Beyond, Markus Schulz, Aly & Fila, Dash Berlin, Cosmic Gate and Seven Lions. During the show he hosted an Electric For Life stage at the Stereosonic festival in Sydney which featured performances of Andrew Rayel, MaRLo, Emma Hewitt, and Mark Sherry alongside Emery himself.

Discography

Gareth Emery's production aliases include GTR, Cupa, Digital Blues and a house project under the name Runaway. His production history includes collaborations with artists including Lange, Solid Globe, Jon O’Bir and CERN with releases on a number of labels.

Albums

Studio albums
 Northern Lights (2010)
 Drive (2014)
 100 Reasons to Live (2016)
 The Lasers (2020)
 Analog (2022)

Remix albums
 Northern Lights Re-Lit (2011)
 Drive: Refueled (2015)
 1000 Reasons to Live (2016)
 The Lasers: Unplugged (2020)

Collaborative albums
 Kingdom United (with Ashley Wallbridge) (2019)

Extended plays
 The Ego Surfing (2005)

Singles
 "The Verdict" (2006)
 "Another You, Another Me" (2006)
 "Soul Symbol" (2007)
 "More Than Anything" (2007)
 "This Is New York" (2007)
 "Exposure" (2009)
 "Metropolis" (2009)
 "Sanctuary" (2010)
 "On a Good Day (Metropolis)" (2010)
 "Fight the Sunrise" (2011)
 "Into the Light" (2011)
 "Tokyo" (2011)
 "Concrete Angel" (2012)
 "This Is All Out" (2012)
 "The Saga" (2012)
 "DUI" (2012)
 "Meet Her in Miami" (2013)
 "Lights & Thunder" (2014)
 "Isolate" (2014)
 "We Were Young" (2016)
 "I Could Be Stronger" (2016)
 "Saving Light" (featuring Haliene) (2017)
 "Call to Arms" (featuring Evan Henzi) (2018)
 "Take Everything" (featuring Emma Hewitt) (2018)
 "Kingdom United" (with Ashley Wallbridge) (2019)
 "Lionheart" (with Ashley Wallbridge) (2019)
 "Electric Pirates" (with Ashley Wallbridge) (2019)
 "Amber Sun" (with Ashley Wallbridge) (2019)
 "Never Before" (with Ashley Wallbridge featuring Jonathan Mendelsohn) (2019)
 "Mezzanine" (2019)
 "Laserface 01 (Aperture)" (2019)
 "Laserface 02 (Thoughts In Pieces)" (2019)
 "Laserface 03 (Leaving You)" (2019)
 "Somebody" (featuring Kovic) (2019)
 "Yesterday" (with Nash featuring Linney) (2020)
 "You Are" (featuring Emily Vaughn) (2020)
 "You'll Be Okay" (featuring Annabel) (2020)
 "Elise" (2020)
 "End of Days" (2020)
 "Gunshots" (2020)
 "CVNT5 of the Caribbean" (with Ashley Wallbridge) (2020)
 "Sad Song" (with The Lasers) (2021)
 "Friendly Fires" (featuring Dani Poppitt) (2021)
 "Calling Home" (featuring Sarah De Warren) (2021)
 "Love You For All Time" (featuring Annabel) (2022)
 "This Is Not The End" (featuring Roddy Woomble) (2022)
 "Forever & Always" (with Armin van Buuren featuring Owl City) (2022)
 "Breathe" (featuring Annabel) (2022)
 "California" (featuring Gid Sedgwick) (2022)

Remixes
2009: Oceanlab - "Lonely Girl" (Gareth Emery Remix)
2011: Britney Spears — "I Wanna Go" (Gareth Emery Remix)
2015: Cosmic Gate featuring Emma Hewitt - "Going Home" (Gareth Emery Remix)
2018: Signum featuring Scott Mac — "Coming On Strong" (Gareth Emery and Ashley Wallbridge Remix)
2020: Fatum and Dylan Matthew — "Train To Nowhere" (Gareth Emery Remix)
2021: Will Sparks and Gareth Emery - "Next Generation" (Gareth Emery Remix)
2021: Morgan Page and Gian Varela featuring Fagin - "Lost" (Gareth Emery Remix)

References

External links
 
 The Gareth Emery Podcast website
 Biography – Resident Advisor
 Biography – i:Vibes
 TranceSound interview, September 2010

1980 births
Living people
English DJs
English record producers
English trance musicians
Musicians from Southampton
Monstercat artists
Revealed Recordings artists
Electronic dance music DJs